South Melbourne tram depot was a depot on the Melbourne tram network, located on the corner of Kings Way and Dorcas Street, South Melbourne. It was opened in 1925 by the Melbourne & Metropolitan Tramways Board, as Hanna Street. In September 1960, it was renamed South Melbourne. On 25 June 1967, W class trams leaving the depot in the early morning featured on the live international Our World TV Special.

The depot closed on 8 February 1997, with operations being transferred to the new Southbank depot, except for route 16, which was transferred to Malvern depot, although trams continued to visit the depot for a few months to use the wheel lathe. In November 1997, the  site was sold to developer Renak Holdings for $19 million. The buildings were demolished in June 1998 and the area redeveloped as office accommodation.

References

External links
Photos of remnants of South Melbourne tram depot - Wongm's Rail Gallery

Tram depots in Melbourne
Transport infrastructure completed in 1925
1925 establishments in Australia
1997 disestablishments in Australia
Demolished buildings and structures in Melbourne
Buildings and structures demolished in 1998